Gemini Rights is the second studio album by American musician Steve Lacy. It was released on July 15, 2022, by RCA Records. It follows Lacy's debut album Apollo XXI (2019), and was preceded by the singles "Mercury", "Bad Habit" and "Sunshine". "Bad Habit" became Lacy's first song to enter the Billboard Hot 100 and later became his first number one single.

The album includes guest appearances from Fousheé, and Lacy's Internet bandmate, keyboardist Matt Martians. Incorporating a variety of genres, the album has been described as an amalgamation of indie rock and alternative R&B, with elements of funk, jazz, and psychedelia.

Gemini Rights received positive reception from music critics upon its release. The album reached the top ten of the Billboard 200 chart, and topped the Top Rock Albums chart. The album won Best Progressive R&B Album at the 65th Annual Grammy Awards.

Background
Lacy produced "about 90% of the record" and came up with the title while "tipsy" at a bar, also telling Zane Lowe that he wanted Gemini Rights to be concise so listeners could "make a decision to want to keep playing it again". Lacy shared that the album is a collective story of him “coming into [himself] after a breakup.” He hoped the album is left to be interpreted by people “[however] they want to.” Gemini Rights is an album that amplifies the artist’s “majestic mystique” discography, leading Lacy to hit #1 on Billboard Hot 100 for three weeks straight, months following the summer release date in 2022. Gemini Rights is an album that Lacy hopes “will make people feel more unconditional love for one another.”

Critical reception

Gemini Rights received a score of 80 out of 100, based on eight critics' reviews, at review aggregator Metacritic, indicating "generally positive reviews”. Mankaprr Conteh of Rolling Stone wrote that the album "feels like the product of a grand jam session" and a "tight collection of rock and R&B, funk and jazz, psych and hip-hop that's as warm and airy as the cusp of summer, when Geminis are born". Reviewing the album for NME, Thomas Smith found Lacy's "musical palette is more refined and vibrant than ever", describing the album as a "fearlessly funky" and "seriously steamy" follow-up with "bold leaps forward and artistic flourishes" that is a "more polished and assured work than his debut".

Shahzaib Hussain stated that Lacy "taps into the legacy of The Love Below-era André 3000" as he "channels the musical touchstones of yesteryear into something reachable for a generation exploring more than ever before concepts of personal autonomy and identity", although "the heady high of hedonism" offered by the album "is only ever fleeting and it never really fills the void". Luke Cartledge of Loud and Quiet acknowledged that the album is "not without flaws: occasionally, the lozenge-smooth nature of the production allows some tracks to drift into coffee-table politeness" and "easygoing groove or pseudo-improv [...] But such shortcomings are easily forgiven; the self-assurance of Steve Lacy is far from unearned".

Track listing

Personnel
Musicians
 Steve Lacy – vocals (all tracks), bass (3, 5), guitar (3)
 Ely Rise – keyboards (1), piano (2), synthesizer (3, 4)
 Asia Lacy – background vocals (2, 8, 10)
 Vage Webb – background vocals (2, 8, 10)
 Valerie Lacy – background vocals (2, 8, 10)
 Valyn Spottsville – background vocals (2, 8, 10)
 Crystal Torres – horn (3)
 John Carroll Kirby – organ (3), synthesizer (5–10)
 Karriem Riggins – drums (9)
 Denise Stoudmire – background vocals (10)

Technical
 Steve Lacy – production (1–5, 7–10)
 Matt Martians – production (6), miscellaneous production (3, 4)
 DJ Dahi – co-production (4, 10), miscellaneous production (3)
 Mike Bozzi – mastering
 Neal Pogue – mixing
 Karl Wingate – engineering

Charts

Weekly charts

Year-end charts

References

2022 albums
Albums produced by Steve Lacy
Steve Lacy (guitarist) albums